Jacob Nielsen Larsen (born 12 January 1978, in Horsens) is a Danish former cyclist.

Palmares

2002
2nd Poreč Trophy 5
2004
1st Stage 4 International Cycling Classic
2006
1st Stage 2 Tour of Siam
1st Stage 11 International Cycling Classic
1st Stage 5 Tour d'Indonesia
2007
1st Stage 6 Tour de la Martinique
3rd Overall Tour of South China Sea
2009
1st Grand Prix Copenhagen-Odsherred Classic

References

1978 births
Living people
Danish male cyclists
People from Horsens
Sportspeople from the Central Denmark Region